See also Frederik Winkel Horn (1845-1898)

Frederik Winkel-Horn, born Frederik Horn (12 November 1756 in Copenhagen – 19 May 1837), Danish writer.

From 1812 he called himself Winkel-Horn.

Works
 Verdensalt, 1834
 Min aandige Skjerv, 1837

1756 births
1837 deaths
Danish male writers